Elena Lyubovna Karpushenko (born May 26, 1961 in Moscow, RSFSR, USSR) is an honored Master of Sports coach of Russia in Rhythmic gymnastics.

Coaching career 
Karpushenko is the personal coach of three-time World all-around champion and Worlds record holder Yana Kudryavtseva. She was introduced by a swimming coach, who was friends with the Kudryavstev family to their daughter, Yana. Karpushenko has been the trainer of Kudryavtseva since she started rhythmic gymnastics.

Notable trainees 
 Yana Kudryavtseva - 2016 Olympic silver medalist, Three-time World All-around champion, 2015 European Games champion.
 Alina Ermolova - 2016 European Junior Champion in rope.
 Tatiana Kurbakova - 2004 Olympics Gold medal in Group all around.
 Alexandra Ermakova - 2006 European Junior Champion in rope.

References

External links
 Elena Karpushenko
 Rhythmic Gymnastics Results

1961 births
Living people
Russian gymnastics coaches
Sportspeople from Moscow
Honoured Coaches of Russia